The 1986 Mercantile Credit Classic was the seventh edition of the professional snooker tournament. The tournament was played at the Spectrum Arena, Warrington, Cheshire, and was televised on ITV from the last 16 round which started on 3 January 1986.

The earlier rounds (Pre last 16) were played between 8–13 November 1985. Defending champion Willie Thorne lost at the last-64 stage to Tony Jones 3–5.

Cliff Thorburn beat Doug Mountjoy 9–6 in the first semi-final. Thorburn led 5–2 after the first session and then 7–3 before Mountjoy won two frames in a row. Thorburn won the match in the 15th frame with a break of 72. Jimmy White beat Rex Williams 9–7 in the second semi-final, Williams having led 6–5.

Jimmy White won his first ranking, event beating Cliff Thorburn 13–12 in the final, winning on the final . White had been 7–8 behind at the end of the first day's play in the final, including a one frame penalty for arriving two minutes late for the start of the Saturday evening session.

The tournament had a prize fund of £225,000, with the winner receiving £45,000.

Main draw
Results are shown below.

Final

Qualifying
Qualifying took place in November 1985. The leading 32 players started at the last 64 stage. Results are shown below.

Century breaks
A total of nine century breaks were made during the event. White received £1,125 for making the highest break of the pre-televised stage, 135.
135, 117, 117  Jimmy White
109, 107, 103  Doug Mountjoy
107  Cliff Thorburn
102  Neal Foulds
101  Martin Smith

References

Classic (snooker)
Classic
Classic
Classic
Sport in Warrington